Li Fang (born 27 January 1993) is a Chinese footballer.

Club career
In 2011, Li Fang started his senior football career with China League Two club Sichuan FC as a forward. He moved to Terceira Divisão side Pombal in December 2011 and played three matches for Pombal in the 2011-12 season. Li returned to Sichuan in June 2012 and then transferred to Segunda Liga side Sporting Covilhã in August 2012. On 28 November 2012, he made his debut for Covilhã in a league match against União da Madeira where he coming on as a substitute for Hugo Moreira in the 86th minute. He left Covilhã at the end of 2012/13 league season.

In February 2014, Li transferred to China League One side Chengdu Tiancheng. He made his debut for Chengdu on 27 July 2014 in a 2–1 home defeat against Qingdao Hainiu, coming on as a substitute for Gao Xiang in the 82nd minute. At Chengdu he would play in midfield and defence, however none of these changes would help in seeing the club avoid relegation at the end of the season, which saw Li become an unattached player in 2015 after Chengdu dissolved due to the downgrade.

Li joined China Super League side Chongqing Lifan in the 2016 season. He made his debut in a 2016 Chinese FA Cup match against Tianjin Quanjian with a 4–0 away defeat, coming on for Yang Yun in the 70th minute.

Career statistics 
Statistics accurate as of match played 31 December 2019.

References

External links
 

1993 births
Living people
Chinese footballers
Footballers from Sichuan
People from Guangyuan
Association football forwards
Liga Portugal 2 players
S.C. Covilhã players
S.C. Pombal players
Chengdu Tiancheng F.C. players
Chongqing Liangjiang Athletic F.C. players
Chinese expatriate footballers
Expatriate footballers in Portugal
Chinese expatriate sportspeople in Portugal
Chinese Super League players
China League One players
China League Two players